Vegora (before 1926: Νέογραδ - Neograd) is a village in Florina Regional Unit, Macedonia, Greece.

The Greek census (1920) recorded 800 people in the village and in 1923 there were 800 inhabitants (or 170 families) who were Muslim. Following the Greek-Turkish population exchange, in 1926 within Neograd there were 24 refugee families from Asia Minor and 58 refugee families from Pontus. The Greek census (1928) recorded 315 village inhabitants. There were 89 refugee families (308 people) in 1928. 

Vegora had 469 inhabitants in 1981. In fieldwork done by Riki Van Boeschoten in late 1993, Vegora was populated by a Greek population descended from Anatolian Greek refugees who arrived during the population exchange. Pontic Greek was spoken in the village by people over 30 in public and private settings. Children understood the language, but mostly did not use it.

References 

Populated places in Florina (regional unit)

Amyntaio